José Castro (born May 5, 1958) is a Cuban professional baseball coach for the Chicago White Sox of Major League Baseball (MLB). He was previously a coach for the Seattle Mariners, Chicago Cubs, and Atlanta Braves.

Career
Castro defected from Cuba with his family at the young age of seven in 1965.
Castro went to Miami Jackson Senior High school where they retired his number, "9".   Signed out of high school in 1977, Castro played minor league ball for 14 years, with 10 of these being at the Triple-A level, however, he never played in the majors, and instead went right into coaching, which he has done ever since.

Castro played in Minor League Baseball as an infielder for 14 seasons (1977–1990) without ever reaching the majors, Castro also spent part of the 2010 season as the manager of the Tacoma Rainiers, the Triple-A affiliate of the Mariners.

Castro served as the hitting coach with the San Diego Padres Triple-A affiliate Portland Beavers from 2005–2006, and the Montreal Expos now-defunct Triple-A affiliate Edmonton Trappers in 2003. He was announced as the roving minor league hitting instructor for the entire Seattle Mariners organization in December 2007. 

Following Seattle Mariners manager John McLaren's firing on June 19, 2008, bench coach Jim Riggleman was promoted to the top spot, Lee Elia was moved from hitting coach to bench coach, and Castro became the new hitting coach for the team. On January 13, 2009, he was named the Mariners' minor league hitting coordinator. On August 9, 2010, Castro was promoted from hitting coach to interim manager of the Tacoma Rainiers, replacing Daren Brown. The Mariners had named Brown their manager after firing Don Wakamatsu earlier that day.

Before the 2013 season began, the Kansas City Royals named Castro their assistant minor league hitting coordinator. Castro spent the 2014 season with the Chicago Cubs as a quality assurance coach, and was subsequently hired by the Atlanta Braves as an assistant hitting coach.

The White Sox hired Castro as their hitting coach after the 2022 season.

References

External links

Coach's page from Retrosheet
KOMO radio interview on June 17, 2008
USA Today article November 29, 2008
Venezuelan Winter League

1958 births
Living people
Atlanta Braves coaches
Auburn Phillies players
Buffalo Bisons (minor league) players
Chicago Cubs coaches
Cuban baseball coaches
Cuban emigrants to the United States
Denver Bears players
Denver Zephyrs players
Edmonton Trappers players
Indianapolis Indians players
Major League Baseball hitting coaches
Minor league baseball managers
Navegantes del Magallanes players
Cuban expatriate baseball players in Venezuela
Oklahoma City 89ers players
Omaha Royals players
Peninsula Pilots players
Reading Phillies players
Seattle Mariners coaches
Spartanburg Phillies players
Baseball players from Havana
Sports coaches from Miami
Baseball players from Miami
Syracuse Chiefs players
Miami Jackson Senior High School alumni